"Tomboy" is a song recorded by South Korean girl group (G)I-dle for their first studio album I Never Die. It was released as the album's lead single by Cube Entertainment on March 14, 2022. The song marked the first release of (G)I-dle as a quintet following the departure of member Soojin in August 2021.

Background and release
On February 17, 2022, Cube Entertainment announced (G)I-dle would be releasing a new album in March 2022 as a five-member group after Soojin, who was embroiled in a school bullying controversy, departed in August 2021. On February 24, it was announced (G)I-dle would be releasing their first studio album I Never Die on March 14. Four days later, the album's track listing was released, with "Tomboy" confirmed as the lead single. On March 7, the audio teaser video was released. The music video teaser was released on March 11 and 12. On May 20, a remix version by R3hab was released.

Composition
"Tomboy" was written by Soyeon, who also composed and arranged the song alongside Pop Time and Jenci. Musically, it was described as a rock and pop punk song with lyrics about "independence and breaking the mold [of] being a 'perfect' girlfriend". "Tomboy" was composed in the key of C-sharp minor with a tempo of 124 beats per minute.

Commercial performance
"Tomboy" debuted at number two on South Korea's Gaon Digital Chart in the chart issue dated March 13–19, 2022; on its component charts, the song debuted at number two on the Gaon Download Chart, number five on Gaon Streaming Chart, and number 35 on Gaon BGM Chart. The song ascended to number one on the Gaon Digital Chart, Gaon Download Chart, and Gaon Streaming Chart in the following week. On the Billboard K-pop Hot 100, the song debuted at number 21 in the chart issue dated March 20–26, 2022, ascending to number one in the following week. The song debuted at number three on the Billboard South Korea Songs in the chart issue dated May 7, 2022, ascending to number one in the chart issue dated June 4, 2022.

In Singapore, the song debuted at number four on the RIAS Top Streaming Chart in the chart issue dated March 18–24, 2022. The song also debuted at number 13 on the RIAS Top Regional Chart in the chart issue dated March 11–17, 2022, ascending to number one in the following week. The song also debuted at number six on the Billboard Singapore Songs in the chart issue dated April 2, 2022. On the Billboard Vietnam Hot 100, "Tomboy" debuted at number 32 in the chart issue dated March 24, 2022, ascending to number 12 in the following week. In Hong Kong, the song debuted at number 22 on the Billboard Hong Kong Songs in the chart issue dated March 26, 2022, ascending to number 11 the following week. In Taiwan, "Tomboy" debuted at number 15 on the Billboard Taiwan Songs in the chart issue dated March 26, 2022, ascending to number five in the following week. In Malaysia, the song debuted at number 13 on the RIM International Singles Streaming Chart in the chart issue dated March 18–24, 2022. The song also debuted at number 11 on the Billboard Malaysia Songs in the chart issue dated April 2, 2022, ascending to number nine in the following week.

In United States, the song debuted at number 14 on the Billboard World Digital Song Sales in the chart issue dated March 26, 2022, ascending to number 12 in the following week. Globally, the song debuted at number 58 on the Billboard Global 200 in the chart issue dated April 2, 2022.

Music video
The music video, directed by Samson of High Quality Fish, was released by Cube Entertainment on March 14. It was described as "vibrant and powerful" and featuring "[the quintet in] Y2K-inspired alternative fashion [causing] havoc across the [scenes] with badass explosions, casual vandalism and boss choreography [in the first half]" before transitioning to "portray [the quintet] as dolls who work together as a team to drug, kidnap and rid themselves of a male doll who serves as [their] 'love interest'". The music video accumulated 10 million views within 16 hours of its release. On March 28, 2022, it was reported that the video surpassed 70 million views. On January 17, 2023, the music video surpassed 200 million views.

Promotion

Prior to the album's release, on March 14, 2022, (G)I-dle held a live event online to introduce the album and its songs, including "Tomboy", and to communicate with their fans. They subsequently performed on four music programs in the first week: Mnet's M Countdown on March 17, KBS's Music Bank on March 18, MBC's Show! Music Core on March 19, and SBS' Inkigayo on March 20. In the second week, the group performed on six programs: SBS MTV's The Show on March 22, MBC M's Show Champion on March 23, Mnet's M Countdown on March 24, KBS's Music Bank on March 25, MBC's Show! Music Core on March 26, and SBS' Inkigayo on March 27, where they won first place for all appearances except Music Bank. In the third week, the group performed on Mnet's M Countdown on March 31 and SBS's Inkigayo on April 3, where they won first place for both appearances.

Accolades

Credits and personnel

Song credits
Credits adapted from Melon.
 (G)I-dle – vocals
 Soyeon – background vocals, lyrics, composition
 Pop Time – composition, arrangement
 Jenci – composition, arrangement

Visual credits
 Son Seung-hee  – Music video director
 Kim Se-hwan  – Performance director
 Hyunzzinii  – Choreographer
 Kiel Tutin – Choreographer

Charts

Weekly charts

Monthly charts

Year-end charts

Certifications

Release history

See also
 List of Gaon Digital Chart number ones of 2022
 List of Inkigayo Chart winners (2022)
 List of K-pop Hot 100 number ones of 2022
 List of K-pop songs on the World Digital Song Sales chart
 List of M Countdown Chart winners (2022)
 List of Show! Music Core Chart winners (2022)
 List of Show Champion Chart winners (2022)
 List of The Show Chart winners (2022)

References

(G)I-dle songs
2022 songs
2022 singles
Billboard Korea K-Pop number-one singles
Cube Entertainment singles
Gaon Digital Chart number-one singles
Korean-language songs
Songs written by Jeon So-yeon